Vila Fachini Biological Reserve is a biological reserve in the city of São Paulo, Brazil.

The Vila Fachini Biological Reserve was created by decree nº. 45.803 in 1965.
It is in the municipality of São Paulo, and in 2003 was one of the conservation units that benefited from federal funding provided by ICMS Ecológico.

Notes

Sources

Biological reserves of Brazil
Protected areas of São Paulo (state)
1965 establishments in Brazil
Protected areas established in 1965
Protected areas of the Atlantic Forest